Crazy Hole Creek is a stream in the U.S. state of South Dakota.

According to the Federal Writers' Project, the origin of the name of Crazy Hole Creek is obscure.

See also
List of rivers of South Dakota

References

Rivers of Todd County, South Dakota
Rivers of South Dakota